The 2002 Kabul bombing was a car bombing that killed 26 people and wounded 167 on September 5, 2002, in front of the Ministry of Information and Culture building in Kabul, Afghanistan. It was the biggest and deadliest attack since the formation of the Karzai administration. The Taliban, al-Qaeda, and Gulbuddin Hekmatyar's group have all been suspects. It came shortly after Hekmaytar called for a holy war against the foreign troops of ISAF. A few hours after the bombings, Hamid Karzai narrowly survived an assassination attempt by a Taliban member in the city of Kandahar.

See also 
 List of massacres in Afghanistan

References 

2002 murders in Afghanistan
2000s building bombings
2002 bombing
21st-century mass murder in Afghanistan
Attacks on buildings and structures in 2002
2002 bombing
2002
Car and truck bombings in Afghanistan
Car and truck bombings in the 2000s
Improvised explosive device bombings in 2002
Mass murder in 2002
2002 bombing
September 2002 crimes
September 2002 events in Asia
Terrorist incidents in Afghanistan in 2002
War in Afghanistan (2001–2021)